Pisidian may refer to:

Pisidian people
Pisidian language

See also
Pisidian spring minnow

Language and nationality disambiguation pages